Gyula Iványi (10 March 1864 – 6 December 1920) was a Hungarian fencer. He competed in the individual sabre event at the 1900 Summer Olympics, where he finished in 5th place.

References

External links
 

1864 births
1920 deaths
Martial artists from Budapest
Hungarian male sabre fencers
Olympic fencers of Hungary
Fencers at the 1900 Summer Olympics
Date of birth missing